Sir Martin Nicholas Sweeting  (born 12 March 1951) is the founder and executive chairman of Surrey Satellite Technology Ltd (SSTL). SSTL is a corporate spin-off from the University of Surrey, where Sweeting is a Distinguished Professor who founded and chairs the Surrey Space Centre.

Education
Sweeting was educated at Aldenham School and the University of Surrey, completing a Bachelor of Science degree in 1974 followed by a PhD in 1979 on shortwave antennas.

Career and research
With a team he created UoSAT-1, the first modern  'microsatellite,' which he convinced the National Aeronautics and Space Administration (NASA) to launch, as a secondary piggyback payload into Low Earth orbit alongside a larger primary payload in 1981. This satellite and its successors used amateur radio bands to communicate with a ground station on the University campus. During the 1980s Sweeting took research funding to develop this new small-satellite concept further to cover possible applications such as remote sensing, and grew a small satellites research group that launched a number of later satellites. This led to the formation of Surrey Satellite Technology Ltd in 1985, with four employees and a starting capital of just £100, and to a know-how technology transfer program, introducing space technologies to other countries. SSTL was later spun off from the University and sold to Astrium in 2009 for a larger sum.

Awards and honours
In 2000 Sweeting was awarded the Mullard Award by the Royal Society and was elected a Fellow of the Royal Society in the same year. In recognition of his pioneering work on cost-effective spacecraft engineering, Sweeting was knighted in 2002. In 2006 he received the Times Higher Education Supplement Award for Innovation for the Disaster Monitoring Constellation (DMC).  In 2008 he was awarded the Royal Institute of Navigation Gold Medal for the successful GIOVE-A mission for the European Galileo system, awarded the Sir Arthur Clarke Lifetime Achievement Award, and named as one of the "Top Ten Great Britons." In 2009 he was awarded the Faraday Medal by the Institute of Engineering and Technology, and an Elektra Lifetime Achievement Award by the European Electronics Industry. In 2014, the Chinese Academy of Sciences award. In 2021 he was a guest on BBC Radio 4 programme The Life Scientific.

References

1951 births
Living people
Alumni of the University of Surrey
Academics of the University of Surrey
Fellows of the Royal Academy of Engineering
Fellows of the Institution of Engineering and Technology
Fellows of the Royal Society
Fellow Members of the IEEE
Knights Bachelor
Officers of the Order of the British Empire
British electronics engineers